Randel "Randy" Guss (born March 7, 1967) is an American musician and drummer.  He was best known as the drummer for the band Toad the Wet Sprocket from its formation in 1986 until he stopped touring in 2017 and left the band in 2020.

Career 

Guss formed Toad the Wet Sprocket with Glen Phillips, Todd Nichols, and Dean Dinning in 1986.

As of January 2020, Guss left the band and no longer records or performs with them.  The primary reason for his departure is that he was unable to tour due to the progression of his osteogenesis imperfecta. Josh Daubin filled in for Randy for a time and has since become the full-time drummer for the band.

Since his retirement, Randy has found joy and fulfillment in teaching and continues to do so both remotely and in-person from his studio in San Diego, CA.

Personal life 
Guss was born in Detroit, Michigan, and moved to Goleta, California at roughly four months old when his father, an English professor, took a job at UC Santa Barbara. He graduated from San Marcos High School in 1985 with Toad bandmates Todd Nichols and Dean Dinning. Randy currently resides in San Diego, California. He has osteogenesis imperfecta.

Guss has a brother named Sean and two sisters named Amy and Lena. He married his wife Heather in 1994 and has one son, Caleb Guss (born September 16, 1996).

Discography

With Toad the Wet Sprocket 
 Bread & Circus (1989)
 Pale (1990)
 Fear (1991)
 Dulcinea (1994)
 In Light Syrup (1995)
 Coil (1997)
 New Constellation (2013)
 Architect of the Ruin (EP) (2015)

With Lapdog 
Mayfly (2003)

With Duplex 
Two Guitars, Bass and Drums (2011)

References

External links
 Randy's official website
 Toad the Wet Sprocket official website
 Interview with Randy Guss
 Randy Guss bio
 Walk on the Ocean

1967 births
American rock drummers
Toad the Wet Sprocket members
Living people
Musicians from San Diego
Musicians from Michigan
20th-century American drummers
American male drummers
20th-century American male musicians
People with osteogenesis imperfecta